Naguilán River is a river in Valdivia Province, southern Chile. It originates from the confluence of several minor streams in the Valdivian Coast Range and drains to Tornagaleones River, which in turn at the end outflows in Valdivia River.

See also
List of rivers of Chile

Rivers of Chile
Rivers of Los Ríos Region